According to its Brill listing The Journal for the Study of the Historical Jesus "investigates the social, cultural and historical context in which Jesus lived, discusses methodological issues surrounding the reconstruction of the historical Jesus, examines the history of research on Jesus, and explores how the life of Jesus has been portrayed in historiographical reception and other media. The Journal for the Study of the Historical Jesus presents articles and book reviews discussing the latest developments in academic research in order to shed new light on Jesus and his world."

Editor 
The current executive editors of the journal are:

 James G. Crossley, St Mary's University, Twickenham;
 Anthony Le Donne, United Theological Seminary, Dayton.

External links
 Journal for the Study of the Historical Jesus

Quest for the historical Jesus
Journals about ancient Christianity
Brill Publishers academic journals
Publications established in 2003